Dead Air is the debut studio album by American alternative rock band Heatmiser. It was released in 1993 on Frontier Records.

Recording 
Dead Air was recorded at Sound Impressions in Milwaukie, Oregon, and mixed at Whitehorse Studios in Portland, Oregon. According to Tony Lash, the Dead Air versions of "Bottle Rocket" and "Lowlife" reuse the basic tracks from their Music of Heatmiser EP demo counterparts, but feature new vocal and guitar overdubs.

Reception 

Dead Air has received a generally mixed response from critics.

Trouser Press wrote, "Dead Air is laced with hints of Fugazi, Hüsker Dü, and Helmet, although the record is not nearly as distinctive as any of those bands", describing it as "a textbook example of the strengths and weaknesses of early '90s indie hard rock. Particularly on 'Stray', 'Still' and 'Lowlife', the energy and urgency are enough to rescue the music from the merely generic. But just barely."

Track listing 
 "Still" (Elliott Smith)
 "Candyland" (Neil Gust)
 "Mock-Up" (Smith)
 "Dirt" (Smith)
 "Bottle Rocket" (Gust)
 "Blackout" (Smith)
 "Stray" (Smith)
 "Can't Be Touched" (Gust)
 "Cannibal" (Smith)
 "Don't Look Down" (Gust)
 "Sands Hotel" (Gust)
 "Lowlife" (Smith)
 "Buick" (Gust)
 "Dead Air" (Smith)

Personnel 
 Heatmiser

 Neil Gust – vocals, guitar, art direction
 Tony Lash – drums, production, engineering, mixing, art direction
 Brandt Peterson – bass guitar, art direction
 Elliott Smith – vocals, guitar, art direction

 Technical

 Steve "Thee Slayer Hippy" Hanford – production
 Bob Stark – recording, engineering assistance
 Super Duper – digital editing
 John Golden – mastering
 J.J. Gonson – photography
 Gustavo del Chucho Bravo – cover photo

References 

1993 debut albums
Heatmiser albums
Frontier Records albums